Capital Memorial Park (also known as Capital Memorial Park Cemetery) is a cemetery located in Austin, Texas, United States. Tom Hamilton is buried there.

References

Cemeteries in Austin, Texas